The cycling competition at the 1987 Pan American Games was held from August 7 to August 23, 1987 in Indianapolis, United States. There were a total number of seven men's and three women's events. The 1987 Games represented the first time women competed in cycling at the Pan American Games. Events were held at the Major Taylor Velodrome and at Brown County State Park.

Men's competition

200 m Match Sprint (Track)

1 km Time Trial (Track)

50 km Points Race (Track)

4000 m Individual Pursuit (Track)

4000 m Team Pursuit (Track)

Individual Race (Road, 171 km)

Team Time Trial (Road, 100 km)

Women's competition

200 m Match Sprint (Track)

3000 m Individual Pursuit (Track)

Individual Race (Road, 57 km)

Medal table

References
Results

Pan American
1987
Events at the 1987 Pan American Games
1987 in road cycling
1987 in track cycling
International cycle races hosted by the United States
Cycling in Indiana